Wissahickon station is a passenger rail station on SEPTA's Manayunk/Norristown Line in Northwest Philadelphia. In FY 2013, Wissahickon station had a weekday average of 410 boardings and 452 alightings.

The station was recently upgraded as part of a major reconstruction project that involved the integration of a former trackless trolley electrical substation and short-turn loop known as the Wissahickon Transfer Center, located across Ridge Avenue and downhill from the rail station.
On a typical weekday, the transfer center sees around 7,000 riders.

Station layout

References

External links
 SEPTA - Wissahickon Station (Official site)
 Station from Google Maps Street View

SEPTA Regional Rail stations
Former Reading Company stations